Dunavant Cotton Manufacturing Company, also known as Alpine Cotton Mill No. 1, is a historic cotton mill located at Morganton, Burke County, North Carolina.  It is a two-story, brick-clad, side gable-roofed building.  The original section was built in 1888–1910, with additions and expansions through 1966.  The additions to the building, made in the mid to late 1960s were removed in 2012 to reveal the original 1888-1910 mill building.  It is the oldest cotton textile mill in
Morganton, and was in use as a cotton textile mill until 1949.

It was listed on the National Register of Historic Places in 2013.

References

Industrial buildings and structures on the National Register of Historic Places in North Carolina
Industrial buildings completed in 1888
Buildings and structures in Burke County, North Carolina
National Register of Historic Places in Burke County, North Carolina
Cotton mills in the United States